John Mahaffy is the name of:

John Pentland Mahaffy (1839–1919), Irish classicist and polymathic scholar
John Mahaffy (ice hockey) (1918–2015), Canadian hockey player